Mesosignidae is a family of crustaceans belonging to the order Isopoda.

Genera:
 Bermudasignum George, 2003
 Costasignum George, 2003
 Japanosignum George, 2003
 Kurilosignum George, 2003
 Mesosignum Menzies, 1962

References

Isopoda